Allie McLaughlin (born 30 October 1990) is an American female mountain runner, world champion at the World Long Distance Mountain Running Championships (2014).

McLaughlin was gold medal with the national team at senior level at the 2017 World Mountain Running Championships.

In 2020 McLaughlin won the US Trail marathon championships

References

External links
 Allie McLaughlin at Association of Road Racing Statisticians

1990 births
Living people
American female mountain runners
World Long Distance Mountain Running Championships winners
21st-century American women